Callalily is the eponymous third album of Filipino rock band Callalily released on October 12, 2009 by Musiko Records &  Sony Music Philippines. The album's singles include "Nananaginip", "Gabay", "Liwanag" and the limited radio and internet single, "Right".

The band notes that this album is more organic and is a return  to the musical style of their debut album.

Track listing

 Langit – 3:59
 Liwanag – 3:48
 Nananaginip – 4:20
 Gabay – 4:17
 Dance All Night – 3:31
 Dahilan – 4:21
 Someday Oneday – 4:03
 Right – 3:09
 Nagagalit – 3:28
 Eyes On Me (Ooo-Lala) – 3:41
 L.O.V.E. – 3:31
 Goodnight – 6:10

External links
Album page on Sony Music Entertainment Philippines

References

2009 albums
Callalily albums